Øre is a small village area in Gjemnes Municipality in Møre og Romsdal county, Norway.  The village is located along the Batnfjorden, about half-way between the villages of Batnfjordsøra and Torvikbukt. Øre Church is located in this village.  The village of Øre was the administrative centre of the old Øre Municipality which existed from 1838 until 1965.  The village is located along the County Road 666 (Ørvegen road), which runs along the fjord, and the County Road 288 (Skeisdalsvegen road), which runs into the surrounding Skeisdalen valley.  The village is wedged in a valley between two mountains (Kammen and Blånebba) and the fjord.

References

Gjemnes
Villages in Møre og Romsdal